Human rights in Europe are generally upheld. However, several human rights infringements exist, ranging from the treatment of asylum seekers to police brutality. The 2012 Amnesty International Annual Report points to problems in several European countries. One of the most accused is Belarus, the only country in Europe that, according to The Economist, has an authoritarian government. All other European countries are considered to have "some form of democratic government", having either the "full democracy", "flawed democracy", or a "hybrid regime".

Unlike its member states, the European Union itself has not yet joined the Convention on Human Rights as of 2011.

History 

The history of human rights in Europe is marked by a contradictory combination of legislative and intellectual progress and violations of fundamental human rights in both Europe and its colonies.

Pre-1945 
 1215: Magna Carta
 1222: Golden Bull of 1222 of Hungary defines the first time the rights of the nobility.
 1264: Statute of Kalisz – the General Charter of Jewish Liberties introduces numerous right for the Jews in Poland, leading to an autonomous "nation within a nation"
 1367: Statutes of Kilkenny
 1463: Sultan Mehmed II's firman grants freedom to Bosnian Franciscans after the Ottoman conquest of Bosnia
 15th to 19th centuries: African slave trade
 1505: Nihil novi in Poland forbids peasant from leaving their lands without permission from their feudal lord
 1525: Twelve Articles of Memmingen, Bavaria, Germany
 1529: Statutes of Lithuania
 1550–1551: Bartolomé de las Casas debates Juan Ginés de Sepúlveda on human rights (Valladolid debate)
 1573: The Warsaw Confederation confirms the religious freedom of all residents of Poland
 1650–1660: Jesuit priest António Vieira fights for the human rights of the indigenous population of Brazil and obtains royal decrees against their enslavement
 1689: The English Bill of Rights is established
 1689: The Claim of Right Act is passed by Scottish Parliament
 1690: The Second Treatise of Civil Government by John Locke
 1750–1860: The Inclosure Act is passed by the United Kingdom Parliament, enclosing common land and assigning private property rights to lands which formerly had not been private
 1772: British court ruling by William Murray, 1st Earl of Mansfield sets a precedent that slavery had no basis in law
 1781: Serfdom is abolished in the Habsburg countries through the emperor Leopold II ( Bohemia, Moravia and Austrian Silesia)
 1783:
 Serfdom is abolished in the first German state, Baden
 Poland-Lithuania abolishes corporal punishment
 1789: The Declaration of the Rights of Man and of the Citizen is introduced in France
 1790: Rights of Man by Thomas Paine
 1792: Denmark made transatlantic slave trade illegal but the prohibition wouldn't take effect before 1803 (slavery was still legal). 
 1794:
 France abolishes slavery
 The Proclamation of Połaniec, Poland, partially abolishes serfdom and grants substantial civil liberties to peasants
 1802: France re-introduces slavery
 1804: The Napoleonic Code forbids privileges based on birth, establishes freedom of religion, and specifies a meritocratic system for government jobs
 1807: Britain abolishes the slave trade (but not of slavery itself)
 1810: Prussia abolishes serfdom
 1832: The British Reform Act extends voting rights and legalizes trade unions
 1833: Britain abolishes slavery
 1845: Another United Kingdom General Inclosure Act allows for the employment of inclosure Commissioners, who could enclose land without submitting a request to Parliament. Private property rights over formerly unenclosed lands expand.
 1848: France abolishes slavery
 1859: On Liberty by John Stuart Mill
 1861: Russia abolishes serfdom
 1863: The Netherlands abolishes slavery
 1867: Britain's Second Reform Act extends voting rights to all urban male homeowners
 1884: The British Representation of the People Act extends male voting rights from the town to the country
 1906: Finland is the first European country to introduce universal suffrage in national elections
 1917: Finland extends universal suffrage to local elections
 1918: Another British Representation of the People Act grants suffrage to nearly all men, along with property-owning women over age 30
 1933–1945: The Holocaust

1945–1984 
 1954–1956: Britain tortures and kills at least 50,000 Kenyans in the Mau Mau Rebellion
 1954–62: Both France and the FLN use torture in the Algerian War of Independence
 1961: French police massacre pro-FLN Algerians in a peaceful demonstration later known as the Paris massacre
 1972: British Army shoots unarmed protesters in Northern Ireland, later known as Bloody Sunday
 1974: Turkey invades and ethnically cleanses 80–87% of the population of Kyrenia, Ammochostos, Rizokarpaso and parts of Nicosia Cyprus. Turkey's use of Napalm on civilians is condemned. Systematic Rape requires the passing of emergency legislation by the British Parliament to allow Medical Officers to perform emergency abortions of raped women. Missing people number about 1,652. Footage of civilians taken to Turkey reveal some people were taken alive but still remain unaccounted for.
 1978: European Court of Human Rights rules that torture by the British government of suspect IRA members constitutes "cruel and inhuman treatment"

1984–present 
The states of the EU, as well as Iceland, Norway, Switzerland, and the European microstates, generally have clean human rights records. The prospect of EU membership (which also entails subscription to the European Convention on Human Rights) has encouraged several European states, most notably Croatia and Turkey, to improve their human rights, especially on freedom of speech and banning the death penalty. However, certain laws passed in the wake of the War on Terrorism have been condemned for encroaching on human rights. There has been criticism of the French law on secularity and conspicuous religious symbols in schools and the French legislation for protecting the public against certain cults. In the UK, a new British Bill of Rights has been advocated to: protect wider range of economic, political, judicial, communication, and personal rights and freedoms; extend normal rights and freedoms to presently unprivileged business-economic minority classes; strengthen and extend the liberal social order; and establish a new independent Supreme Court with the power to strike down government laws and policies that violate basic rights and freedoms.

Latvia  

In Latvia, citizenship, usage of mother tongue, and ethnic-based discrimination are the most acute problems for its Russian minority. Currently, half of the Russian-speaking community of Latvia are Latvian citizens, while the other half do not have citizenship of any country in the world. They form the unique legal category of "Latvian non-citizens". In some spheres their status is similar to that of citizens of Latvia (for example, in receive consular support abroad), while in some spheres they have fewer rights than foreigners (recent immigrants from EU countries can vote at municipal and EP elections but Latvian non-citizens cannot).

The Russian minority in Latvia is on the decline due to emigration and the negative birth rate. The death rate among Russians in Latvia is higher than that of Latvians in Latvia and Russians in Russia, in part due to the unfavourable social conditions that have come about in Latvian cities following the enforced destruction of the industrial economy in the beginning of the 1990s.

Former USSR states 
Following the collapse and break-up of the Soviet Union, its history of severe human right abuses were laid in the open. The situation has since improved in the majority of formerly communist states of Europe, especially of those in Central Europe. These Central European states have aligned themselves with the EU (most of them becoming members in 2004) and have undergone a rigorous reform of human rights laws, most notably regarding freedom of speech and religion and the protection of minorities, particularly of the Romani. However, the former USSR states have made slower progress. Despite all but Belarus becoming members of the Council of Europe, constant conflict between minority group separatists in the Caucasus has led these states to pass strict laws with the aim of limiting rebellions.

Armenia 

A series of mass protests were held in Armenia in the wake of the Armenian presidential election of 19 February 2008. Mass protests against alleged electoral fraud were held in the capital city of Yerevan and organised by supporters of the unsuccessful presidential candidate and first President of Armenia, Levon Ter-Petrosyan. After nine days of peaceful protests at the Opera Square, the national police and military forces tried to disperse the protesters on 1 March. The protests began on February 20, lasted for 10 days in Yerevan's Freedom Square, and involved tens of thousands of demonstrators during the day and hundreds camping out overnight. As a result, 10 people were killed. Despite the urges of the government to stop the demonstrations, the protests continued until March 1. On the morning of March 1, police and army units dispersed the 700–1,000 persons who remained overnight, beating them with truncheons and electric-shock devices. As of March 4, many protesters are still missing. Since March 1, Ter-Petrosyan was placed under de facto house arrest.

Belarus 

Belarus is often described as "Europe's last dictatorship". The press is strictly censored by the government, and freedom of speech and protest have been removed. Although Belarus' post-independence elections match the outward forms of a democracy, election monitors have described them as unsound.

Russia 

Russia has partaken in some questionable acts, such as replacing elected governors with appointed ones and censoring the press, claiming many of these measures are needed to maintain control over its volatile Caucasus border, where several rebel groups are based. The Economist`s Democracy Index classified Russia as a "hybrid regime" in 2007,. Since then
Russia was downgraded to an authoritarian regime, which the report attributes to concerns over the December 4 legislative election and Vladimir Putin's decision to run again in the 2012 presidential election. 2015 Democracy Index showed the same result.

Former Yugoslavian states 
Following the collapse of communism in Yugoslavia, the state held together by the strong rule of Josip Broz Tito, several of the nations which made it up declared independence. What followed was several years of bloody conflict as the dominant nation, Serbia, attempted at first to hold the state together, and then instead to hold onto Serb-populated areas of neighbouring nations in order to create a "Greater Serbia". Within Serbia itself there was conflict in Kosovo, where Serbs are a minority.

The now six states of the former Yugoslavia, (Bosnia and Herzegovina, Croatia, Macedonia, Montenegro, Serbia, and Slovenia) are in various stages of human rights development. Slovenia, which suffered least in the Yugoslav wars, is a member of EU and is widely considered to have a good human rights record and policy, Croatia joined the EU and is considered to have a good human rights, Republic of Macedonia and Montenegro have formed stable governments and have fair human rights records.
However, Bosnia-Herzegovina and Serbia retain questionable rights records, the former entirely governed under UN Mandate, as is a part of the latter (Kosovo). Bosnia-Herzegovina is the most ethnically diverse of the former Yugoslavian states, with large groups of Bosniaks, Croats, and Serbs, making peace difficult to attain. Both Bosnia and Serbia are classified as democracies by The Economist, with the former being a "hybrid regime" and the latter a "flawed democracy".

Universal suffrage 
Universal suffrage was introduced in European countries during the following years:
 1906: Finland
 1913: Norway
 1915:
 Denmark
 Iceland
 1917:
 Russia
 Lithuania
 Latvia
 Estonia
 1918:
 After the Central Powers' defeat in World War I and collapse of Habsburg Empire:
 Germany
 Austria
 Hungary
 Poland
 Czechoslovakia
 Luxembourg
 1919:
 Netherlands
 Sweden
 1922: Ireland (after receiving independence)
 1923: Romania
 1928: United Kingdom
 1930: Turkey
 1931: Portugal
 1931: Spain
 1944: France
 1946:
 Italy
 Yugoslavia
 Malta
 1948: Belgium
 1952: Greece
 1960:
 Cyprus
 San Marino
 Monaco
 1971: Switzerland
 1975: Portugal
 1976: Spain
 1984: Liechtenstein

Known issues

Human trafficking 

The end of communism, the collapse of the Soviet Union and Yugoslavia, and easier global travel have contributed to an increase in human trafficking, with many victims being forced into prostitution, hard labour, agriculture, and domestic service. The conflicts in the former Yugoslavia have also been a key factor in the increase of human trafficking in Europe. The problem is particularly severe in Belgium, the Netherlands, Germany, Italy and Turkey; these countries, along with Thailand, Japan, Israel and the United States are listed by the UNODC as top destinations for victims of human trafficking.

The Council of Europe Convention on Action against Trafficking in Human Beings was adopted by the Council of Europe on 16 May 2005. The aim of the convention is to prevent and combat the trafficking in human beings. The convention entered into force on 1/2/2008. As of June 2017 it has been ratified by 47 states (including Belarus, a non Council of Europe state), with Russia being the only state not to have ratified (nor signed).

Amnesty International has called on European states to sign and ratify the convention as part of the fight against human trafficking.

Council of Europe / European Union 

The Council of Europe is responsible for both the European Convention on Human Rights and the European Court of Human Rights. These institutions bind the Council's members to a code of human rights which, though strict, are more lenient than those of the Universal Declaration of Human Rights. The Council also promotes the European Charter for Regional or Minority Languages and the European Social Charter.

The Council of Europe is separate from the European Union, but the latter is expected to join the European Convention and potentially the Council itself. The EU also has a separate human rights document: the Charter of Fundamental Rights of the European Union. Since March 2007 the EU has had a Fundamental Rights Agency based in Vienna, Austria.

The Office of the United Nations High Commissioner for Human Rights is responsible for promoting and protecting the human rights defined in international human rights treaties in Europe. In late 2009, the High Commissioner opened a Regional Office for Europe which is mandated to promote and protect human rights in 40 European countries, including member states, candidate states, and potential candidate (the Balkans, Iceland, Norway and Turkey).

See also 

 Capital punishment in Europe
 Charter of Fundamental Rights of the European Union
 European Convention on Human Rights
 European Court of Human Rights
 Council of Europe
 List of human rights articles by country
 Environmental racism in Europe
 Human rights in East Asia
 Human rights in the Soviet Union
 Human rights in the United States

Notes

References 

 
Human rights by region